Auntie Mame is a 1958 American Technirama Technicolor comedy film based on the 1955 novel of the same name by Edward Everett Tanner III (under the pseudonym Patrick Dennis) and its 1956 theatrical adaptation by Jerome Lawrence and Robert Edwin Lee. This film version stars Rosalind Russell and was directed by Morton DaCosta. It is not to be confused with a musical version of the same story that appeared on Broadway in 1966 and was later made into a 1974 film, Mame, starring Lucille Ball as the title character.

Plot
Patrick Dennis, orphaned in 1928 when his father Edwin dies unexpectedly, is placed in the care of his aunt Mame Dennis in Manhattan. Mame is flamboyant and exuberant, hosting frequent parties with a variety of guests and free-spirited friends including the frequently-drunk actress Vera Charles; Acacius Page, who runs a nudist school; and Lindsay Woolsey, a book publisher. Mame quickly becomes fond of Patrick, and aims to give him as broad a view of life as possible. Patrick's inheritance is managed by Dwight Babcock, a trustee of the highly-conservative Knickerbocker Bank, who was instructed by Edwin to restrain Mame's influence. Without Babcock's knowledge, Mame enrolls Patrick in Page's school. When this is discovered, Babcock forcibly enrolls Patrick into his alma mater, preventing Mame from seeing her nephew except during holidays and during the summer.

When Mame is bankrupted by the 1929 stock market crash, she takes a series of jobs which end disastrously. During one job as a Macy's sales girl, she meets Southern oil baron Beauregard Jackson Pickett Burnside. Both are smitten, and he invites Mame to his estate. Despite an attempt on her life by Beau's original betrothed, Mame and Beauregard are married, travelling around the world for their honeymoon. Mame continues to receive letters from Patrick (and vice versa), indicating Babcock is influencing him into a more conventional personality. After Beau dies while climbing the Matterhorn in 1937, Mame comes home after a prolonged period of mourning to discover the now-adult Patrick gifted her with a dictaphone, typewriter, and secretary, Agnes Gooch. He and her friends persuade her to write her autobiography. Patrick and Lindsay arrange for a collaborator/ghost writer for Mame, Brian O'Bannion, who rapidly proves to be a fortune hunter.

Patrick announces to Mame that he is engaged to Gloria Upson, a girl approved by Babcock from a "restricted" community in Connecticut called Mountebank. Mame is initially angered by the change in his character, but relents to please him. She also sabotages O'Bannion's attempted wooing by sending Agnes to a party in her place, lying to O'Bannion that Agnes is a secret heiress. When Agnes returns, she barely remembers the evening, thinking they saw a movie with a wedding scene. After Mame meets Gloria, who proves to be spoiled and prejudiced, she visits Gloria's parents in Mountebank at their house, "Upson Downs", some time later. Finding them to be boorish and anti-Semitic, she invites them and Gloria to a dinner party at her apartment with Patrick, Babcock, and some of her friends.

On the night of the party, Patrick meets Mame's new secretary Pegeen, and the two are attracted to each other; Agnes also lives there, now pregnant due to her night with O'Bannion and presumed to be unmarried. The entire party is choreographed to show up the Upsons:  Lindsay surprises the attendees with galleys from Mame's autobiography, reminding Patrick of forgotten adventures. The book's release prompts a telegram from O'Bannion demanding half the royalties for his efforts, also revealing that he married Agnes on their night out. When Gloria insults Mame's company, Patrick instead defends them and insults Gloria's own circle, ending their relationship. Mame dedicates her royalties to a home for refugee Jewish children in Mountebank, much to the Upsons' horror. The Upsons leave in a huff. Mame berates Babcock for his attempts to manipulate Patrick's life; he also leaves. By 1946, Patrick and Pegeen are married and have a son Michael. Mame and Michael persuade his parents to let Mame take the child on a journey to India, and the movie fades as Mame tells Michael of all the wondrous sights they will see.

Cast

 Rosalind Russell as Mame Dennis
 Forrest Tucker as Beauregard Jackson Pickett Burnside
 Coral Browne as Vera Charles
 Fred Clark as Dwight Babcock
 Roger Smith as Patrick Dennis – older
 Patric Knowles as Lindsay Woolsey
 Peggy Cass as Agnes Gooch
 Jan Handzlik as Patrick Dennis – younger
 Joanna Barnes as Gloria Upson

 Pippa Scott as Pegeen Ryan
 Lee Patrick as Doris Upson
 Willard Waterman as Claude Upson
 Robin Hughes as Brian O'Bannion
 Connie Gilchrist as Norah Muldoon
 Yuki Shimoda as Ito
 Brook Byron as Sally Cato MacDougall
 Carol Veazie as Mrs. Burnside
 Henry Brandon as Acacius Page

Production
Morton Da Costa directed the stage adaptation, which ran from October 1956 through June 1958, for 639 performances. Rosalind Russell originated the role of Mame and was nominated for the 1957 Tony award for Best Performance by a Leading Actress in a Play. She played Mame until January 20, 1958, when Greer Garson took over the part. Russell, Peggy Cass, Yuki Shimoda and Jan Handzlik reprised their Broadway roles in the film.

The Motion Picture Herald review observed that the film "provided a unique means of establishing time and plot progression" through the changing decor of Mame's Beekman Place apartment. The review in the Los Angeles Examiner (June 1958) named six different styles: Chinese, 1920s Modern, "Syrie Maugham” a French style named for writer Somerset Maugham's wife; English, Danish Modern and East Indian. When the Upsons visit Mame, they run afoul of the Danish Modern furniture, which is equipped with lifts. The film received an Academy Award nomination for Best Art Direction (Art Direction: Malcolm Bert; Set Decoration: George James Hopkins).

The costume design for the film, which include outfits for Mame that coordinate with the sets, was provided by Orry-Kelly, who had worked with Rosalind Russell on a number of films. The New York Times critic Bosley Crowther observed: "The lavish décor of Mame's apartment is changed almost as frequently as are her flashy costumes, and all of them are dazzling, in color and on the modified wide-screen."

Rosalind Russell broke her ankle on the first take of a scene where she runs down the stairs. Filming was delayed until she recovered.

Several online sources, including Rotten Tomatoes' and AllMovie's biographies of actor and journalist Joanna Barnes, mistakenly describe  Gloria Upson as "Vassar educated". Gloria is "an Upper Richmond Girls School girl”, and proud of it. She does not understand the concept of a college major, but proclaims that the school is "top drawer." In 2008, in  The Seattle Weekly, Gavin Borchert described the character succinctly as a "lockjawed prep princess". On AllMovie, Hal Erickson adds that the character "spoke as though she had novacaine in her upper lip (the playwrights' description of the character)."

Reception
Rosalind Russell drew wide praise for her performance. In an article describing why Turner Classic Movies has named it one of “The Essentials.” Andrea Passafiume observes that the role transformed Russell's career, “first on the Broadway stage and then on the big screen. Having long been a top level movie star throughout the 1930s and 40s, Russell's career in Hollywood was dwindling as she settled into middle age. The role of Mame Dennis... gave her the chance to be glamorous and showcase her sharp comedic talents, which reminded the world that she was still a vital force to be reckoned with. The success of the play made her the toast of Broadway, and the hit film gave her her first Oscar® nomination as Best Actress in more than a decade".

Passafiume adds that the film also transformed Warner Bros. Studios, which was "desperate for a hit, having suffered through a string of recent disappointments which put the once thriving studio increasingly in the red. Auntie Mame was the answer to their prayers and helped restore the studio's former glory." Auntie Mame became the second highest-grossing film of 1958, earning a net profit of $8,800,000.

Bosley Crowther of The New York Times wrote that "for all its absurd exaggerations and bland inconsistencies, this picture of a tireless party-giver is a highly entertaining thing to see. And, because of the gags that gush from it, it is a constantly amusing thing to hear. Variety called the film "a faithfully funny recording of the hit play, changed only in some small details to conform to motion picture mores ... Rosalind Russell recreates the title role for the film and re-establishes herself as a top picture personality." Harrison's Reports called the film "a fast and furious comedy, with a glamorous background and considerable deep human appeal ... Rosalind Russell, who scored a huge success in the stage play, repeats her wonderful performance as the uninhibited heroine in this screen version. She fits the role so ideally that it is difficult to imagine any one else in the part."

Richard L. Coe of The Washington Post called the film "broad as the Atlantic, too broad for me, but it's still a hilarious, observant comedy ... Miss Russell remains just plain wonderful in the part." John McCarten of The New Yorker dismissed the film, writing that Russell "works hard," but that the film "bogs down badly before it has gone any distance." The Monthly Film Bulletin wrote that the film was "virtually a one-woman revue, a series of turns—Mame as hostess, shopgirl, telephone operator, counterfeit Southern Belle, writer, actress—carried along on a strong current of personality. Rosalind Russell, who created the part on the stage, takes a turn or two to get into her stride; once established, however, her superbly confident timing and powerfully empathic comedy personality see her happily through."

Leonard Maltin gives the film 3.5 out of 4 stars: “ Episodic but highly entertaining, sparked by Russell's tour-de-force performance.”

As of September 2020, Auntie Mame has a score of 93% on the review-aggregation website Rotten Tomatoes, based on 14 reviews.

Awards and honors

Others
The film is recognized by American Film Institute in these lists:
 2000: AFI's 100 Years...100 Laughs – #94
 2005: AFI's 100 Years...100 Movie Quotes:
 Mame Dennis: "Life is a banquet, and most poor suckers are starving to death!" – #93

Home media
Auntie Mame was released on Blu-ray on December 5, 2017 with an all new HD remaster of the film and an audio-only track of music from the film.

See also
 List of American films of 1958

References

External links

 
 
 
 
 

1958 films
1950s English-language films
1958 comedy-drama films
American comedy-drama films
Best Musical or Comedy Picture Golden Globe winners
Films about orphans
Films based on American novels
American films based on plays
Films featuring a Best Musical or Comedy Actress Golden Globe winning performance
Films scored by Bronisław Kaper
Films set in Connecticut
Films set in the 1920s
Films set in the 1930s
Films set in the 1940s
Films with screenplays by Betty Comden and Adolph Green
Mame
Warner Bros. films
Films based on adaptations
1958 directorial debut films
1958 comedy films
1958 drama films
Films set in New York City
Films directed by Morton DaCosta
1950s American films